The 1997 Nationalist Movement Party Extraordinary Congress referred to two party conventions held by the Nationalist Movement Party (Turkish: Milliyetçi Hareket Partisi - MHP), a far-right ultranationalist political party in Turkey, following the death of their first leader Alparslan Türkeş. The first congress was held on 18 May 1997, where six candidates ran for the party leadership. Türkeş's eldest son, Tuğrul Türkeş emerged with a plurality of the vote while Devlet Bahçeli came second. The remaining candidates subsequently withdrew in support for Bahçeli, resulting in violence breaking out between party members supporting rival candidates. The second round was subsequently delayed until 6 July.

In their campaign speeches, Türkeş attacked Bahçeli for allegedly disrespecting the legacy of his father, whereas Bahçeli claimed that Türkeş's supporters did not have a place in the party. Devlet Bahçeli was elected in the second round with 697 delegates' votes as opposed to Türkeş's 483, prompting Türkeş to resign from the party and establish the Bright Turkey Party (ATP) in 1998. The ATP was dissolved in 2010 after Türkeş rejoined the MHP in 2007 and became a Member of Parliament for Istanbul in the 2007 general election.

Results

4th extraordinary congress, 18 May 1997

5th extraordinary congress, 6 July 1997

References

Nationalist Movement Party Congresses
1997 conferences